Justin Lee Collins: Good Times is a British comedy chat show hosted by comedian Justin Lee Collins, which aired on Channel 5 in the United Kingdom. The format is a weekly chat show that consists of a mixture of celebrity guests, comic stunts, and musical performances.

Episodes

References

External links
.

2010 British television series debuts
2010 British television series endings
2010s British comedy television series
British television talk shows
Channel 5 (British TV channel) original programming
English-language television shows
Television series by Endemol